Christopher Mends (22 February 1724 - 5 April 1799) was a Methodist exhorter and later an independent minister.

Mends was one of nine children of a cloth merchant. He was born near Hasguard, Pembrokeshire, though his date of birth is disputable, being either in 1724 or 1725. In 1741 he lived with his brother, William, at Laugharne, and the two were working as fullers when they were converted by Whitefield's preachings and consequently became exhorters. By 1748, the two were using a house at Laugharne or Sunday worship which received relatively high attendance considering the 'weak' support for the group of societies organised by the brothers in Carmarthen and Laugharne. In 1749, Christopher became an Independent minister in Brinkworth, Wiltshire where he remained until his move to Plymouth in 1761. Christopher died in Plymouth 5 April 1799.

External links 

 Biography
 Trans. Carms. Ant. Soc., iii, 73
 Evangelical Magazine, 1799, autobiography, 397
 Trans. Angl. Ant. Soc., 1942, p33-41

1724 births
1799 deaths
Welsh Methodist ministers
18th-century Welsh clergy